The Wil Tower is a wooden observation tower which was built in the forest of Wil in Switzerland by Julius Natterer. It was opened for public use on 8 July 2006.

Construction
The tower is an open structure, rising on 6 slanted columns from three equidistant ground support points. A circular stairway (189 steps) rises in the center of the columns, opening onto a roofed observation deck.

The structure is entirely of wood, all obtained from the surrounding forest.  The columns are Douglas-fir and the stairway is of Silver fir.  The wood was harvested in the early months of 2005 and allowed to dry naturally for a year before construction began.

References 

Towers completed in 2006
Towers in Switzerland
Buildings and structures in the canton of St. Gallen
Tourist attractions in the canton of St. Gallen
Wil
Wooden towers
21st-century architecture in Switzerland